Kelly is the debut studio album by Italian singer Andrea Faustini. It was preceded by release of the single "Give a Little Love", the video for which premiered on 17 July 2015. Kelly debuted and peaked at number 14 on the UK Albums Chart.

Background

Regarding the album, Faustini said: "I'm such a positive person, and I like to smile even in tough times. This is what life is about for me - be kind to the people you love (and the people you don't), and always smile... In other words, give a little love!"

Lead single "Give a Little Love" received its debut airplay on BBC Radio 2 on 2 June 2015.

One of the songs on the album, "What Would Dusty Do", was co-written by The Voice UK finalist Vince Kidd.

Track listing
Note: All tracks produced by Graham Stack and Matt Furmidge.

Charts

References

2015 debut albums
Andrea Faustini albums